Pyay (also known as Prome and Pyè) is principal town of Pyay Township in the Bago Region in Myanmar. It is an important trade center for the Ayeyarwady Delta, Central and Upper Myanmar and the Rakhine (Arakan) State. The British Irrawaddy Flotilla Company established the current town in the late 19th century on the Irrawaddy as a transshipment point for cargo between Upper and Lower Burma. The English novelist Jane Austen's brother Rear Admiral Charles Austen died here in 1852.

The district of Pyay encompasses the valley of the Irrawaddy, located between Thayet, Hinthada and Tharrawaddy districts. Along the western side of Pyay District are the Arakan Mountains and along the eastern side are the Pegu Range. Pyay District's main towns are Pyay, Shwetaung, and Paungde.

Etymology 

Geography 
The north and north-east of the district is forest-covered, and contains numerous valleys and ravines, which unite in one large stream called the Naweng River. The most important of the plains lie in the south and south-west portions of Pyay, and extend along the whole length of the railway that runs between. There are, in addition large tracts of land covered by jungle, which are available for cultivation. The principal river is the Irrawaddy, which intersects the district from north to south; next in importance are the Thani and its tributaries and the Naweng system of rivers. In the hills near the capital the soil is of Tertiary formation, and in the plains it is an alluvial deposit.

History 
Much debate surrounds the construction of Sri Ksetra. Htin Aung suggests that Pyu might have been founded in 78 CE, based on the Sanskrit / Pyu Era. D. G. E. Hall and Gordon Luce, however, claim that civilisation of the Irrawaddy Valley could not have been possible before the 4th century, thus, attributing the founding of Sri Ksetra to 638, from which the current Burmese Kawza Era begins.

Sri Ksetra was the capital of the Pyu dynasty of Vikrama. The city contained both housing and farms, as is evident from the remains of waterways and tanks which have been discovered.

The Chinese pilgrims Xuanzang and Yijing mentioned Sri Ksetra in their mid-7th-century accounts. It is not known when precisely the Pyu abandoned Sri Ksetra and moved northward. It is speculated that their decline was due to the growth of the Irrawaddy river delta, cutting it off from coastal trade, and also from Mon and later Tai Shan incursions. Burmese chronicles state that when Anawrahta invaded the southern parts of modern-day Myanmar in 1057, he ordered the ruins of Sri Ksetra to be destroyed to prevent rebels from sheltering there. The Burmese came to call the old Pyu center Pyi. The extensive ruins have been the subject of intensive archaeological investigation.

Called Prome by the British (after the name that appears in the Portuguese texts of the 17th century), the city became part of British territory after the Second Anglo-Burmese War in 1853. The town was taken by the British in 1825 during the Battle of Prome and again in 1852, on both occasions with hardly any opposition. In 1862, it was almost entirely destroyed by fire, and was afterwards relaid out in straight and broad streets. It was erected into a municipality in 1874, and since then great improvements have been made, including waterworks.

During World War II the city was the site of the Battle of Prome. The city was later retaken by the British Army in May 1945.

Climate 
Pyay has a tropical savanna climate (Köppen climate classification Aw). Temperatures are hot throughout the year, especially in the months before the monsoon from March to May when average maximum temperatures exceed . The winter months from December to February are somewhat milder than the rest of the year. There is a winter dry season from December to April and a summer wet season from May to November, although rainfall during this wet season is much less extreme than in coastal cities like Yangon or especially Sittwe.

Economy 
The main crop is rice, but some cotton and tobacco are grown, while the custard apples are famous. Sericulture is extensively carried on by a special class. The forests yield teak and cutch, cotton and silk-weaving are important industries; there are also manufactures of ornamental boxes, coarse brown sugar and cutch.

Culture 

For a town of its size, Pyay is well-renowned for a number of local delicacies. It is reputed for the Pyay palata (ပြည်ပလာတာ), consisting of paratha, Burmese chicken and potato curry, and raw onions. It is also known for a number of Burmese salads, including the Pyay rice salad (ပြည်ထမင်းသုပ်) and Pyay assorted salad (ပြည်အသုပ်စုံ).

Pyay also produces a local pickled delicacy called taw laphet or  laphet. Originating from Burmese nunneries in the hills surrounding Pyay, the laphet is fermented from the leaves of the naywe (နရွဲ) tree, or kyettet (ကြက်တက်), the Combretum pilosum plant. The pulp is then tightly wrapped into dried banbwe (ဘန့်ပွေး) leaves and left soaking in regularly changed water for up to 2 years, before it is consumed. Taw laphet is otherwise consumed in an identical fashion to traditional laphet.

Tourism

To the south and south-east, the town is closed in by low pagoda-topped hills, on one of which stands the conspicuous gilded Shwesandaw Pagoda. The Shwesandaw Pagoda is a notable Buddhist pagoda in the center of Pyay. It is the terminus for a railway from Yangon, which runs through the district.

To the west of Pyay, crossing Irrawaddy river through Nawaday bridge, stands the Shwebontha Muni Pagoda. The Buddha statue is one of three replica of the Maha Myat Muni Buddha statue, believed to date back 554 B.C. when the king Sandar Thuriya ruled.

Education 
Pyay City has three universities. The universities are Pyay University (PU), Pyay Technological University (PTU), and Computer University, Pyay. Pyay University is situated near to the town centre of Pyay. PTU, which is one of the best ranking University in Myanmar,  is situated near to Hnawgone village and Latkhoukpin village, a few miles away from Pyay. CU, Pyay is also quite a far distance from downtown.

Health care 
Pyay General Hospital
Aung Zaw Oo Hospital
Myo Thuka Hospital
Aung Tharaphu Hospital
Lawkaparla Hospital
Pyi Myanmar Hospital

Notable people 
 

Khin One (1947—2000), Burmese painter, writer, and singer

References

Bibliography 

Old Cities of Mon people
Populated places in Bago Region
Township capitals of Myanmar
Populated places established in the 1st millennium